Maiem is a 2015 Indian Tamil-language action thriller film directed by Aditya Baskaran. The film stars Naveen Sanjai, Jai Quehaeni, Kumaran Thangarajan, Suhasini Kumaran, Hashim Zain, Pooja Devariya, and Muruganandham .

Cast 
Naveen Sanjai
 Jai Quehaeni as Divya
 Kumaran Thangarajan
 Suhasini Kumaran
 Hashim Zain
Pooja Devariya
 Muruganandham
Robo Shankar as Shankar
Raandilya as a thief

Production 
Several cast and crew members were still in college while working on the film, including Aditya Baskaran, the producer and writer; Hashim Zain, an actor; Kaashif Rafiq, the music director; and Varuna Shreethar, the costume designer who was in 10th standard.

Release 
The Times of India gave the film a rating of one-and-a-half out of five stars and wrote that " It is terribly juvenile, with an interesting (on paper, that is) one-line plot that is stretched far enough to make even mozzarella blush, and at nearly two hours, it is a supreme test of patience". The Hindu wrote that "From the acting to the music, it’s all reminiscent of soaps aired by regional TV channels". Deccan Chronicle gave the film a rating of one out of five stars and wrote that "The plot is interesting, but its amateurish treatment by newbie Aditya Bhaskar is a major downer". A critic from Maalai Malar praised the cinematography and songs.

References 

Indian action thriller films
2015 action thriller films
2010s Tamil-language films